Weiße Wölfe is an East German-Yugoslav Red Western film. It was released in 1969, and sold 4,601,516 tickets.

Weiße Wölfe is a sequel of the 1968 film Spur des Falken.

References

External links
 

1969 films
1969 Western (genre) films
German Western (genre) films
East German films
1960s German-language films
Ostern films
German sequel films
1960s German films